List of former and current players from Sydney Olympic FC that represented at New South Wales Premier League or National Soccer League level.

Players 
Player   Land   Position   Date of Birth

A 
 Fred Agius      MF  02.02.1984
 Siraj Al Tall    FW  08.01.1982
 Andy Amegashie     FW  03.09.1978
 John Angelovski      DF  16.07.1976
 Zlatko Arambasic     FW  20.09.1969
 Walter Ardone     MF  30.01.1972
 Elias Augerinos      MF  31.10.1971
 William Angel      MF  01.02.1989

B
 Joe Bačak    MF  23.05.1973
 Scott Baillie     DF  11.03.1970
 Michael Baird    FW  01.08.1983
 Jim Bakis     FW  08.07.1979
 Danny Barbalace      DF  16.12.1973
 David Barrett     DF  21.06.1969
 Huseyin Bayhan    MF  25.12.1975
 Michael Beauchamp    DF  08.03.1981
 Richard Bell    MF  13.11.1955
 Jason Bennett     FW  19.06.1969
 Andy Bernal     DF  16.05.1966
 Adam Biddle  MF    27.07.1988
 Steven Biason     DF
 Milan Blagojevic     DF 24.12.1969
 Raul Blanco    DF  04.12.1941
 Roy Blitz     FW  23.11.1941
 Ken Boden    MF  05.07.1950
 Predrag Bojić    DF  09.04.1984
 Clint Bolton     GK  22.08.1975
 Nick Bosevski   FW  02.12.1976
 Mark Bosnich     GK 13.01.1972
 George Bouhoutsos     GK  03.04.1969
 Dean Bouzanis    GK 02.10.1990
 Raphael Bove    MF  05.03.1977
 Tim Bredbury    FW  25.04.1963
 Mark Brennan    MF  04.10.1965
 Jason Browne     FW  23.05.1987
 John Buonavoglia      FW  19.10.1975
 Mark Byrnes    DF  08.02.1982

C
 German Cabrera     MF  15.09.1985
 Tim Cahill     MF  06.12.1979
 Joe Caleta    FW  30.05.1966
 Zenon Caravella     MF  17.03.1983
 Pablo Cardozo     FW  23.12.1972
 Richard Cardozo     MF  28.03.1986
 Leo Carle    MF  06.06.1980
 Nick Carle    MF  23.11.1981
 Andrew Carman    GK  11.02.1983
 Paul Carter     DF  17.07.1963
 Robert Catlin    GK  22.06.1965
 Morgan Cawley    MF  28.05.1981
 Adrian Cervinski   FW  17.11.1973
 Ken Chun    DF
 Adam Ciantar    DF  15.03.1972
 Michael Cindric    DF 20.11.1982
 Shannon Cole   DF  04.08.1985
 Damon Collina    MF  13.09.1978
 Ron Corry  GK  21.07.1941
 Ante Covic    GK  13.06.1975
 Jason Culina    MF  05.08.1980

D
 Adam D'Apuzzo    MF  20.10.1986
 David D'Apuzzo   DF  05.09.1988
 Ivo De Jesus     MF  23.07.1976
 Stefan De Jesus     DF
 Jean-Paul de Marigny    DF  21.01.1964
 Gareth Deeg    GK  24.08.1978
 Steve Dalianis    FW  23.03.1974
 Ante Deur     MF  04.02.1980
 Arthur Diles      DF    22.04.1982
 Michael Di Meglio    MF  21.03.1985
 Anthony Doumanis    MF  01.02.1982
 John Doyle     FW  17.01.1946
 Bobby Dragas    DF  06.03.1978
 Mehmet Durakovic    AB  13.10.1965
 Andrew Durante    AB  03.05.1982
 Aleksandar Duric      FW  12.08.1970

E
 Steve Eagleton     DF  26.10.1976
 Clive Eaton    FW
 Alistair Edwards    FW  21.06.1968
 Yahya El Hindi  MF  24.09.1998
 Tarek Elrich    MF  01.01.1987
 Brett Emerton     MF  22.02.1979
 Vince Estavilio    MF  17.05.1955

F
 Daniel Firth   FW
 Xavier Forsberg     DF
 Tony Franken    GK  11.01.1965
 Iain Fyfe   DF  03.04.1982

G
 Roger Galayini   MF  11.02.1983
 Robert Gaspar    MF  07.02.1981
 Emmanuel Giannaros   DF      22.04.1989
 Mike Gibson   GK  01.03.1963
 Rudolfo Gnavi    MF  17.09.1949
 Grant Gulabovski    MF
 Carlos Gonzalez   MF  23.11.1977
 Clint Gosling    TW  01.05.1960
 George Goutzioulis    DF  18.01.1978
 Andre Gumprecht    MF  26.12.1974

H
 Aman Hadid           FW      06.09.1988
 Labinot Haliti    MF  26.10.1984
 Troy Halpin    MF  17.08.1973
 George Haniotis   MF  04.06.1966
 Dave Harding    MF  14.09.1946
 Jeromy Harris    MF  07.08.1975
 Anthony Hartshorn  MF
 Ricki Herbert    DF  10.04.1961
 Michael Herbet    TW  27.07.1981
 Wassim Hijazi    FW  31.07.1984
 Matt Hilton    FW  27.02.1986
 Robert Hooker    DF  06.03.1967
 Eric Hristodoulou    MF  23.06.1970
 Dominik Hudak    DF
 Brett Hughes   GK  19.04.1969

I
 Chikelue Iloenyosi      DF   13.10.1980
 Robert Ironside     MF  20.08.1967
 Hiroyuki Ishida      MF  13.08.1979

J
 Harry James      FW  17.01.1976
 Graham Jennings      AB  18.01.1960
 Bojo Jevdjevic      GK  08.01.1972
 Glenn Johnson      FW  16.07.1972
 Hussein Jomaa       MF  05.07.1979
 Ante Jurić     DF  11.11.1973
 Mirko Jurilj     MF  04.11.1973
 Matthew Jurman     DF  08.12.1989

K
 Chris Kalantzis     MF  27.07.1968
 Jerry Kalouris    MF
 Steve Karavatakis    FW  17.07.1970
 Ivan Karlović     DF  20.12.1981
 Peter Katholos         MF  18.03.1961
 Jin Kim     MF
 Corey King    MF
 Michael Kladis    MF  03.09.1977
 John Koch     DF  26.06.1968
 Paul Kohler    DF  05.08.1979
 Steven Koops        DF
 John Kosmina     FW  17.08.1956
 Jim Kourtis     GK  14.02.1973
 Mark Koussas     MF  09.01.1963
 James Kovas     FW  18.06.1983
 John Kyriazopoulos     MF  12.02.1980

L
 Sam La Rocca    MF  11.01.1978
 Kosta Lagoudakis    FW  11.05.1985
 Reuben Lagos    DF
 Sam Larolla    MF  11.01.1978
 Stephen Laybutt    DF  03.09.1977
 Grant Lee   MF  19.10.1961
 Bill Londos          GK      04.12.1964

M
 Dylan Macallister    FW  17.05.1982
 Scott Madden           MF
 Brad Maloney   MF  19.01.1972
 Gary Manuel    FW  20.02.1950
 Petar Markovic    DF  10.07.1983
 Krešimir Marušić    MF  23.11.1969
 James Masurkan           MF  8.5.1994 - †13 August 2010
 Esala Masi   FW  09.03.1974
 Matthew Mayora     MF      10.03.1986
 Trent McClenahan     MF   04.02.1985
 Peter McPherson   FW  18.06.1984
 Gary Meier  GK  10.09.1955
 Jose Mendes        DF  11.08.1974
 Gabriel Mendez    MF  12.03.1973
 Nick Meredith    MF  11.12.1967
 Ante Milicic    FW  04.04.1974
 Branko Milosevic   MF  21.08.1964
 Lee Miot    FW  06.11.1981
 Dave Mitchell   FW  13.06.1962
 Glenn Moore   DF  24.02.1977
 Ante Moric    MF  19.04.1974
 Jim Morris           DF      24.12.1957
 Glen Moss    GK  19.01.1983
 Danny Moulis    DF  25.07.1960
 Carlo Musumeci   DF
 Marino Musumeci   MF

N
 Zlatko Nastevski    MF  04.08.1957
 Jim Nikas   FW  30.10.1975
 Jade North    DF  07.01.1982
 Chimaobi Nwaogazi     FW  27.11.1979

O
 Wayne O'Sullivan     MF  25.02.1974
 Scott Ollerenshaw     FW  09.02.1968
 Nick Orlic    DF  06.08.1970
 Greg Owens   MF  27.01.1981
 Soner Omac    GK      23.02.1975

Ö
 Tolgay Özbey   FW  12.04.1986

P
 Andrew Packer   MF  16.06.1980
 Adrian Pandolfa   MF
 Franco Parisi   FW  03.05.1983
 Tim Parker    MF  14.08.1984
 Jim Patikas   MF  18.10.1963
 Anthony Perri   MF
 John Perosh   GK  29.11.1973
 Angelo Petratos    MF  03.06.1968
 Gary Phillips   MF  09.06.1963
 Marcus Phillips    MF  17.10.1973
 Leon Pirrello   MF
 Derek Poimer    ST  04.12.1973
 Jason Polak    MF  09.01.1968
 Tom Pondeljak    MF  08.01.1976
 Adem Poric    MF  22.04.1973
 Joel Porter    FW 25.12.1978
 Davie Provan       08.05.1956

R
 Vlado Radic   MF  22.08.1965
 James Raiti   FW
 Iain Ramsay    MF  27.02.1988
 Peter Raskopoulos   MF  22.02.1962
 Kain Rastall    MF  12.06.1978
 David Ratcliffe    DF  09.03.1957
 Steve Refenes    MF  19.02.1970
 Jono Reis                FW
 Nick Rizzo     MF     09.06.1979
 Andre Rodrigues    MF  20.10.1973
 Martyn Rogers DF 26.01.1960
 Ivo Rudic    DF  24.01.1942
 Ian Rush     FW  20.10.1961

S
 Abbas Saad     FW  01.12.1967
 Scott Saville     MF 18.09.1968
 Giosue Antuan Sama     FW  02.10.1987
 Mass Sarr Jr    FW  06.02.1973
 Joey Schirripa     DF  09.10.1982
 David Seal    FW  26.01.1972
 Joe Senkalski     MF  20.08.1957
 Craig Sharpley    MF  05.12.1969
 Nathan Sherlock    DF  02.02.1990
 Jordan Simpson      MF  28.08.1985
 Tyler Simpson      DF  28.08.1985
 Milorad Simonović     MF
 Sebastian Sinozic      DF  14.09.1978
 Chris Slater     FW  16.04.1970
 David Smith     DF
 Damien Smith      MF  26.04.1973
 Jacek Sobczyk      DF  02.09.1979
 Marshall Soper      FW  12.05.1960
 George Sorras      DF  11.04.1972
 George Souris     DF  12.11.1969
 Manny Spanoudakis     MF  12.06.1967
 Joe Spiteri      FW  06.05.1973
 Tony Spyridakos      MF  09.04.1964
 Wayne Srhoj      MF  23.03.1982
 Mitchell Stamatellis     DF
 Bruce Stowell    MF  20.09.1941
 George Strogylos     DF
 Brett Studman    DF  19.04.1985
 Milan Susak     DF  29.01.1984

T
 Kimon Taliadoros      FW  28.03.1968
 Daniel Taylor  MF
 Joel Theissen      MF  12.08.1985
 Nick Theodorakopoulos      FW  29.06.1964
 Scott Thomas    MF  19.08.1974
 Brendan Thorpe    MF  10.05.1996
 Steven Tibbetts            MF
 Norman Tome     FW  20.03.1973
 Christos Tomaras FW 14.01.1989
 Kris Trajanovski     FW  19.02.1972
 Peco Trajcevski      GK  11.10.1975
 Philip Trehern     DF  13.10.1975
 Chris Triantis      MF  12.10.1987
 Peter Tsekenis     MF  04.08.1973
 Nestor Tsioustas  GK
 Michael Turnbull     GK  24.03.1981

V
 George Valas      MF  15.07.1977

W
 Craig Wakefield     DF
 George Westwater      MF  26.03.1946
 Ben Willard      DF  31.12.1977
 Lindsay Wilson      MF  04.05.1979
 Paul Wither   MF

Z
 Peter Zairis  FW  30.03.1980 
 Ivan Zelic    DF  24.02.1978
 Ned Zelic     DF  04.07.1971
 Fernando Zerda     MF  01.09.1978
 Peter Zorbas    MF  14.05.1979
 Chris Zoricich     DF  03.05.1969
 Andy Zervas.                     FW      04.05.1967

See also

References

External links

Players
 
Lists of soccer players by club in Australia
Sydney-sport-related lists
Association football player non-biographical articles